The black-billed peppershrike (Cyclarhis nigrirostris) is a species of bird in the family Vireonidae. It is found in the Andes of Colombia and northern Ecuador. Its natural habitats are subtropical or tropical moist montane forests and heavily degraded former forest.

References

black-billed peppershrike
Birds of the Colombian Andes
Birds of the Ecuadorian Andes
black-billed peppershrike
Taxonomy articles created by Polbot